Jayne Hayden (born July 8, 1968, in New York City, New York) is a former operative for the Central Intelligence Agency. She posed nude for Playboy magazine after leaving the top-secret spy agency in 1996. Her photo pictorial appeared in the February 1997 edition of Playboy.

Before entering the CIA, Hayden earned dual bachelor's degrees in Chinese language and Political Science. According to a quote in Playboy, Hayden decided to disrobe for the magazine to demonstrate that "...a woman can be professionally capable without sacrificing her sexuality."

Sources
 Playboy, February 1997.
 The Secrecy News, July 2001 https://fas.org/sgp/news/secrecy/2001/07/072401.html

1968 births
Living people
People of the Central Intelligence Agency